The Australasia County Board of the Gaelic Athletic Association (GAA), or Australasian GAA, or Gaelic Football & Hurling Association of Australasia is one of the county boards of the GAA outside Ireland, and is responsible for Gaelic games all across Australasia. It is also responsible for Australasian inter-state matches, primarily conducted in an annual weeklong tournament. The association is made up of the Australian state associations of New South Wales, Queensland, South Australia, Tasmania, Victoria and Western Australia, and the New Zealand associations of Wellington and Canterbury.

History

Gaelic football in Australia 
In 1840 in Sydney's Hyde Park games of Hurling and Football were played by Irishmen.

In 1843 during Adelaide St Patrick's Day celebrations were held "in genuine Irish style" involving families native to Ireland playing a football game. The game started at 2pm and was played in honour of Saint Patrick.

In 1846 there was controversy when an Irish gathering organised to "play an old Irish game" in Sydney's Hyde Park.

In 1859 there were mentions of arrangements to celebrate "Gaelic games" in Geelong.

In 1864 an article in the Freeman's Journal of Sydney wrote about celebrating a holiday by renewing "some of our old national customs, our old manly games and exercises, hurling, football..."

In 1878 the Kerang Times and Swan Hill Gazette noted that "in the South of Ireland, where football is the exhilarating pastime fostered, usually on Sunday afternoon, when a good grass field or paddock is selected".

In 1887 the Freeman's Journal in Sydney, a catholic publication, printed the GAA's revised rules for Irish football.

Hurling in Australia
In 1860, a hurling match was played in Victoria which attracted a large attendance of Irishmen.

Early governing bodies
The first Australian GAA was formed in Auckland, New Zealand, in 1953.  Victoria's GAA was formed in 1956, followed by New South Wales. This was followed in 1963 by the formation of a South Australian association and associations in Western Australia and Queensland soon after.

The first interstate championships in both codes were played between NSW, Victoria and South Australia in 1971.

In Sydney in 1974 representatives of state associations met and agreed to form the Gaelic Athletic Association of Australia to administer and promote Gaelic football and hurling on a national level. Subsequently, the Gaelic Athletic Association of Australia joined with the New Zealand associations of Auckland and Wellington to form the Gaelic Athletic Association of Australasia.

The last few years have been a time of expansion in the Association. New initiatives and developments, combined with GAA funding, have seen the number of teams competing in Gaelic football more than double.. The current Australasian secretary is Gerard Roe.

Australasian championships
The Australasian Championships, commonly referred to as the Australasian Games, are a week-long tournament staged annually in September/October each year and hosted by one of the member state associations. Tournaments now feature all codes, with hurling played for the first time as part of a championships held in New Zealand in Wellington in 2015, and camogie added full-time in 2012. In most circumstances there is only one side per state per code, but when numbers are low in a code (typically hurling) or in the number of states entered (usually when the tournament is in Western Australia or New Zealand) exceptions to this are made.

The tournament format in each code varies year-to-year depending on the number of entries, but generally involves either a round-robin or pool play format with either two semi-finals or one semi-final with the top qualifier progressing directly to the final. A final is played in each code to determine the champion for the year.

Each association is permitted to name a panel of 22 players in each code for the championships, with unlimited interchange rather than the more traditional substitution rule used for each match. In recent years a 'Visa' rule has been introduced to encourage states to develop their own players. This rule limits the number of players any state may select in any code who are not either Australians or New Zealanders, or have obtained residency in either country.

Hurling
The current Australasian champions are Victoria, who defeated Queensland by 2-11 to 0-12 in Brisbane after losing each of the three previous finals.

Previous years winners included:
2015 NSW def Victoria
2014 Western Australia def Victoria
2013 Western Australia def Victoria

Men's Gaelic football
The current Australasian champions are New South Wales, who defended the title they regained in Wellington in 2015 by defeating Victoria 1-07 to 1-05 in Brisbane.

Previous years winners included:
2015 NSW def Queensland
2014 Victoria def Western Australia
2013 NSW def Wellington

Minor Gaelic football
Victoria, long the dominant force of minor Gaelic Football in Australia, regained the title in 2016 when their Blue side defeated their White team 4-09 to 3-10. South Australia had won the title in 2015, when the minor championships were played in Adelaide rather than in Wellington. 2018 was Victoria White first win in the minor Gaelic football in Australia history defeated Victoria Blue by one point.

Previous years winners include:
2018 Victoria White def Victoria Blue   
2015 South Australia Red def Victoria Blue
2014 Victoria def South Australia
2013 Victoria def Western

Ladies' Gaelic football
In Ladies' Gaelic football, New South Wales won the 2016 title defeating Queensland 1-12 to 3-05 in the final, running their winning streak to four successive titles.

Previous years winners included:
2015 NSW def Western Australia
2014 NSW def Queensland
2013 NSW def Queensland

Camogie
Camogie was added to the Championships full-time in 2013 after being played as an exhibition for several years prior. New South Wales are the current champions, beating Victoria by 0-13 to 1-08.

Previous years winners include:
2015 NSW def Queensland
2014 Queensland def NSW
2013 NSW def Queensland

International honours
The Australasia Ladies' football team have won three Women's World Cup competitions (the tournament does not include Irish sides) in 2000, 2002 and 2005.

See also

Gaelic Athletic Association
Organisation of sport in Australia
Sport in New Zealand

References

External links

 
1974 establishments in Australia
 
Irish-Australian culture
Irish-New Zealand culture
Sports organizations established in 1974